Braunschweiger MTV von 1847, commonly known as MTV Braunschweig, is a German sports club based in Braunschweig, Lower Saxony.

History

MTV Braunschweig was founded as a gymnastics club in 1847 and is the second oldest sports club in Lower Saxony. Like many clubs within the German Turner movement, MTV Braunschweig was initially committed to the national unification of Germany and the goals of the German revolution of 1848.

Originally only open to men, women were allowed to join the club first in 1888. Today MTV is a multi-sports club with departments for association football, athletics, basketball, field hockey, team handball, swimming, table tennis, tennis, volleyball, and others. MTV Braunschweig has been successful in German sports, with the club's athletes having won over 50 national championships in various sports.

Athletics

MTV's athletes compete, together with athletes from other Braunschweig-based clubs such as Eintracht Braunschweig, under the name LG Braunschweig.

Team handball

MTV's team handball team has traditionally been among the club's most successful. In 1987 MTV was promoted to the 2. Handball-Bundesliga, the second tier of professional handball in Germany. The stint was a short one, and MTV was relegated again in 1989. After several years in the lower regional divisions, the club was promoted to the 3. Handball-Liga (III) in 2016.

Football

MTV's football team was most successful during the years directly after World War II. In 1945 the former first division side Leu Braunschweig was merged into the club. Between 1949 and 1954 MTV Braunschweig then played in the Amateuroberliga Niedersachsen, the second tier of football in Germany at the time. The merger was dissolved in 1954, and the refounded club SC Leu Braunschweig took MTV's place in the league. Since then MTV's football team has mostly played in the lower tiers of regional amateur football.

Honours

 Landesliga Niedersachsen, Staffel Braunschweig (II):
Champions (1): 1948

Basketball

In 1978 the club's basketball section entered into a cooperation with FT Braunschweig to form SG Braunschweig, the predecessor of Basketball Bundesliga team Basketball Löwen Braunschweig.

Notable members

 Fritz Bleiweiß, Olympic racewalker
 Michael Green, Olympic field hockey player
 Wolfgang Grobe, footballer, youth player at MTV
 Karen Haude, field hockey player
 August Hermann, physical education pioneer
 René Herms, Olympic middle distance runner
 Ludwig Lachner, former German international footballer, player-manager at MTV
 Hans-Günther Lehmann, Olympic swimmer
 Edmund Malecki, former German international footballer, player and player-manager at MTV
 Jürgen Moll, footballer, youth player at MTV
 Volker Mudrow, German international handballer
 Melanie Paschke, Olympic sprinter
 Walter Ramme, Olympic swimmer
 Alfred Schwarzmann, Olympic gymnast
 Fate Tola, long-distance runner
 Luminita Zaituc, Olympic long-distance runner

References

External links

Official website

Football clubs in Germany
Football clubs in Lower Saxony
Multi-sport clubs in Germany
Athletics clubs in Germany
German handball clubs
Basketball teams in Germany
German volleyball clubs
Field hockey clubs in Germany
MTV
Sports clubs established in 1847
1847 establishments in Germany
19th-century establishments in the Duchy of Brunswick
Organisations based in Braunschweig